is a 1974 live album by the Latin rock band Santana, recorded at the Osaka Kōsei Nenkin Kaikan, Osaka, Japan in July 1973, during their Caravanserai Tour. The Welcome album recording sessions were completed shortly before this concert, and that album was later released in November. Lotus was originally released in 1974 as a triple vinyl LP in Japan only. This version of the album was later released internationally.

In 2017 a limited edition version was released as "Lotus: Complete Edition". This release is a 3 disc set hybrid Super Audio CD with seven previously unreleased bonus tracks. This was also a Japan only release.

Original release 
The 1973 live recordings were mixed in 4-channel quadraphonic sound and released in the CBS Stereo Quadraphonic (SQ) matrix system. The SQ encoding makes it possible to format all 4 channels into a 2 channel stereo version, which is compatible with conventional stereo playback equipment. Some releases of this mix have been marked as "Quadraphonic" or "SQ" and some are not. However, all known releases of Lotus prior to 2017 use the same SQ encoded 2 channel recordings. The 4 channels can still be heard on modern equipment provided that the listener has a proper SQ decoder and 4 channel playback system.

The complete 3-LP set was released in Europe in 1975. The first U.S. release was in 1991 as a 2-CD and 2 cassette tape set. It re-issued again on vinyl in the Netherlands and on CD in Japan in 2006 as a 3-CD set. It was also re-issued as a 3-LP set in the US in 2013. In 2016 this version was also released in the United States by Audio Fidelity on a 2 disc set on Super Audio CD.

2017 "Complete" Edition 
In 2017 "Lotus: Complete Edition" was released in Japan as a 3 disc set hybrid Super Audio CD. Seven bonus tracks were added. In addition to 4.0 surround sound audio there are stereo SACD tracks as well as a stereo CD layer which can be played on conventional CD players.

Track listing

Vinyl

1991 CD reissue

Japanese 3-CD 

The same track listing as the original vinyl release (two sides per CD), except "Mr. Udo" in place of "Savor".

2017 Japanese 3-SACD

Personnel 
 Carlos Santana – guitar, Latin percussion, Echoplex
 Leon Thomas – maracas, vocals
 Tom Coster – Hammond organ, electric piano, Yamaha organ
 Richard Kermode – Hammond organ, electric piano
 Doug Rauch – bass
 Armando Peraza – congas, bongos, Latin percussion
 José "Chepito" Areas – timbales, congas, Latin percussion
 Michael Shrieve – drums, Latin percussion

Charts

See also 
 Agharta (album) – another live album from this time period, also recorded in Osaka, by Miles Davis. Its cover features an Eastern myth-inspired design by Japanese artist Tadanori Yokoo.

References 

Albums produced by Carlos Santana
1974 live albums
Santana (band) live albums
Columbia Records live albums